Dial 1119 is a 1950 film noir directed by Gerald Mayer, nephew of Louis B. Mayer. The film stars Marshall Thompson as a deranged escaped killer holding the customers of a bar hostage. The telephone number "1119" is the police emergency number used in the film.

Plot
Delusional mental patient Gunther Wyckoff (Marshall Thompson) escapes from a mental institution, intent on locating psychiatrist Dr. John Faron (Sam Levene), whose testimony sent him to the asylum. Wyckoff arrives by bus in Terminal City. As he disembarks, he is confronted by the bus driver for stealing his Colt pistol. Wyckoff uses it to kill the driver.

Wyckoff tries to locate Dr. Faron, first at his office and then at his home address – an apartment building – with no luck.  As he leaves the building, it is a warm night, and he notices the Oasis Bar across the street.  He goes into the bar and finds there is a good vantage point from which to observe the entryway to the apartment building. The bar is tended by Chuckles and his assistant/relief-person Skip (whose wife is in the hospital about to have a baby).

Chuckles, seeing a news flash story on the TV, notices that Wyckoff is one of his customers and tries, unsuccessfully, to reach a pistol he has stashed behind the bar. At this point, there are four patrons in the bar: the sluttish barfly Freddy; the young Helen, who is accompanied by an attentive older gentleman, Earl; and newspaper reporter Harrison D. Barnes. Chuckles then tries to telephone the police, but Wyckoff shoots him dead as he is placing the call.  Wyckoff then orders the bar patrons to occupy one table, where he can keep an eye on them. Meanwhile, the gunshot and subsequent scream by Helen attracts attention. As a beat police officer approaches the bar, he is shot in the leg by Wyckoff.  Bystanders rescue the officer, and a call is made for reinforcements to respond to a man barricaded in the bar.

The five hostages discuss what might be going on with Wyckoff. The relief barman, when asked, notes that the gun holds eight rounds, but while he is speaking, Wyckoff replaces the magazine with a new one. Wyckoff calls the police. He demands that the police stay away, but deliver Dr. Faron to the bar within 25 minutes or he will kill the hostages. It is revealed that Dr. Faron is the local police psychiatrist.  The press sets up TV coverage near the bar as the crowd of onlookers grows.

As the police discuss tactics, Faron is found and brought to the bar. Being a newspaperman, Harrison reminds the others that Wyckoff's crime was a big local story three years before.  As Faron pleads with the police to let him attempt to handle Wyckoff, they try to enter the bar undetected.  Wyckoff becomes aware of the attempted breach and seriously wounds an officer. Faron again pleads with the police, saying, "I demand that you let me do my job!", which Wyckoff sees on the TV. The police captain resents Faron's success at getting Wyckoff a light sentence the first time around. The police prepare a breach en masse with two minutes left before Wyckoff's deadline, but Faron slips away and enters the bar.  He tries to convince Wyckoff that he is delusional, but after some discussion, Wyckoff becomes agitated and shoots Faron dead.

The phone rings, and Skip knows it is the hospital calling about his wife. Desperate to answer, he struggles with Wyckoff; at the same moment, the police detonate an explosive charge and extinguish the lights.  In the confusion, Freddy uses Chuckles' under-counter gun to shoot Wyckoff. In shock, he staggers outside and is cut down by police gunfire. As he kneels over Faron's body, the police captain rhetorically asks an officer, "How far does a man have to go to prove that he's right?"

Cast
 Marshall Thompson as Gunther Wyckoff
 Virginia Field as Freddy
 Andrea King as Helen
 Sam Levene as Dr. John D. Faron
 Leon Ames as Earl
 Keefe Brasselle as Skip
 Richard Rober as Captain Henry Keiver
 James Bell as Harrison D. Barnes
 William Conrad as Chuckles, the bartender
 Dick Simmons as Television Announcer
 Hal Baylor as Lieutenant "Whitey" Tallman

Reception
Film critic Glenn Erickson discussed the production values of the film, writing: "1950's Dial 1119 is a low-budget MGM picture that resembles a one-act play expanded to short feature length. With economic pressures coming down hard on the studios, the expense of something like An American in Paris had to be balanced by making other studio producers come up with something for nothing. Thus we have Dial 1119, a taut little suspense item that uses only a couple of sets and utilizes the services of contractees already on the payroll.  The show also resembles a typical live TV production from a few years later, the kind that garnered attention for the likes of James Dean."

Critic Jeff Stafford liked the film, writing: "A taut and suspenseful B-movie, Dial 1119 is distinguished by the crisp black-and-white cinematography of Paul C. Vogel (He worked on such film noir favorites as Lady in the Lake, 1947) and the excellent ensemble cast which includes Virginia Field, Andrea King, Leon Ames, Keith Brasselle, and William Conrad (star of TV's detective series, Cannon, 1971-1976) as the unlucky bartender. It was the first film directed by Gerald Mayer, son of the famous MGM tycoon, Louis B. Mayer, and remains the best movie of his brief career."

Although the film was inexpensively made, it only earned $402,000 in the U.S. and Canada and $201,000 elsewhere, resulting in a loss of $148,000.

DVD release
Warner Bros. released the film on DVD on July 13, 2010, in its Film Noir Classic Collection, Vol. 5.

References

External links
 
 
 
 

1950 films
1950s thriller films
American thriller films
American black-and-white films
Film noir
Films scored by André Previn
Metro-Goldwyn-Mayer films
1950s English-language films
1950s American films